Punjabi Tribune is a Punjabi language daily newspaper owned by  The Tribune Trust, publishes in the Punjab, India. It was launched on 15 August 1978 and became online on the internet in August 2010. Mr Rajesh Ramachandran is the Editor-in-Chief of The Tribune Group of Newspapers. Mr Swaraj Bir Singh is the Editor of Punjabi Tribune.

See also
 The Tribune
Khalsa Akhbar Lahore
List of newspapers
List of newspapers in India by circulation
List of newspapers in the world by circulation

References

External links 

Punjabi Tribune official website
The Tribune official website

Punjabi-language newspapers published in India
Organisations based in Chandigarh
1978 establishments in Chandigarh
Publications established in 1978